Paolo Maino (born 2 March 1989) is a former Italian professional football player.

In 2010–11 he changed his shirt number from 55 to no.13.

References

1989 births
Sportspeople from Como
Living people
Italian footballers
Association football defenders
U.C. AlbinoLeffe players
A.S.D. Barletta 1922 players
Serie B players
Serie C players
Footballers from Lombardy